Chionodes salicella is a moth in the family Gelechiidae. It is found in North America, where it has been recorded from British Columbia to California and in Montana.

The larvae feed on Salix and Alnus species.

References

Chionodes
Moths described in 1967
Moths of North America